Altyn-Tagh (also Altun Mountains, Altun Shan; , Pinyin: A'erjin Shan, Wade–Giles: A-erh-chin Shan; Uyghur:ئالتۇن تاغ) is a mountain range in Northwestern China that separates the Eastern Tarim Basin from the Tibetan Plateau. The western third is in Xinjiang while the eastern part forms the border between Qinghai to the south and Xinjiang and Gansu to the north.

Altun Shan is also the name of a  mountain near the eastern end of the range, the highest point in Gansu.

Etymology 
Altyn Tag means Gold Mountain in Turkic, and Jin Shan is Chinese for  Gold Mountain.

Geography 

A series of mountain ranges run along the northern edge of the Tibetan Plateau. In the west are the Kunlun Mountains. About halfway across the south side of the Tarim Basin, the Altyn-Tagh Range diverges northeast while the Kunluns continue directly east, forming a relatively narrow "V". Inside the "V" are a number of endorheic basins. The eastern end of the Altyn-Shan is near the Dangjin Pass on the Dunhuang-Golmud road in far western Gansu. East of the Altyn-Tagh the border range rises to the Qilian Mountains. The range separates the Tarim Basin, to the north, and Lake Ayakkum, to the south. The range can be divided into three portions.

Along the northern side of the mountains ran the main Silk road trade route from China proper to the Tarim Basin and westward. The Altyn-Tagh and Qilians were sometimes called the Nan Shan ('south mountains') because they were south of the main route. Near the east end of the Altyn-Shan, the Gansu or Hexi Corridor ends and the Silk Road splits. One branch follows the Altyn-Tagh along the south side of the Tarim Basin while the other follows the north side.

There are a dearth of rivers and streams in these mountains, due to the aridity of the region. The western portion has some small streams that either head north into the desert or south into Lake Ayakkum. The remainder of the range is lacking in rivers.

Intermontane endorheic basins 

Inside the "V" shaped area between the Altyn-Tagh and the main Kunlun range (which in this area is called Arka-Tagh) a number of endorheic basins are located.

Within southeastern Xinjiang, the main of these basins is the Kumkol Basin

The two main lakes in this basin are the saline Lake Aqqikkol (also Ajig Kum Kul, Achak-kum; ; 37°05′N, 88°25′E,   elevation) and Lake Ayakum (37°30′N, 89°30′E; elevation  ). These lakes are two of the few noticeable bodies of water in this extremely arid area; the area around them is officially protected as the Altun Shan Nature Reserve.

Farther east, in northwestern Qinghai, the much larger Qaidam Basin starts between the Altyn-Tagh and the Kunlun and extends almost to the east side of the plateau; the Altyn-Tagh separates the west side of this basin from the Kumtagh Desert.

Major Peaks 

Economic development 

China National Highway 315 crosses the Altyn-Tagh on its way between Qinghai and Xinjiang.

The Golmud-Korla Railway (under construction) will cross the Altyn-Tagh as well. The project involves the construction of the 13.195 km-long Altyn-Tagh Tunnel.

Notes

Footnotes

References

Further reading

External links 
 NASA photos of Ayakkum Lake and surrounding area

Highest points of Chinese provinces
Mountain ranges of Gansu
Mountain ranges of Xinjiang